Leptospermum myrtifolium, commonly known as the myrtle tea-tree or grey tea-tree, is a species of shrub that is endemic to south eastern Australia. It has broad egg-shaped to elliptical leaves, white flowers usually borne singly on short side shoots, and fruit that remains on the plant until it dies.

Description
It has thin, rough bark that is shed in flaky layers on the older stems and young stems that are softly-hairy at first. There are broad reddish brown bracts at the base of the flower bud but which fall off well before the flower opens.

Taxonomy and naming
Leptospermum myrtifolium was first formally described in 1825 by Augustin Pyramus de Candolle in his book Prodromus Systematis Naturalis Regni Vegetabilis from an unpublished description by Franz Sieber. The specific epithet (myrtifolium) is from Latin words meaning "myrtle-leaved".

Distribution and habitat
Myrtle tea-tree usually grows in poorly-drained soils in woodland, on the edges of high altitude swamps and along rocky creek banks. It occurs south from the Orange district in New South Wales to eastern Victoria.

References

myrtifolium
Myrtales of Australia
Flora of the Australian Capital Territory
Flora of New South Wales
Flora of Victoria (Australia)
Plants described in 1828